Shuttle Carrier Aircraft ferry flights generally originated at Edwards Air Force Base in California or on one occasion White Sands Space Harbor in New Mexico following missions which landed there, especially in the early days of the Space Shuttle program or when weather at the Shuttle Landing Facility (SLF) at Kennedy Space Center prevented ending missions there.  Flights generally ended at the SLF.  A number of flights began at Armstrong Flight Research Center following delivery of the orbiter from Rockwell International to NASA from the nearby facilities in Palmdale, California.

Ferry Flights

 November 15, 1977 Enterprise, ferry flight test started and ended at the Armstrong Flight Research Center, lasted 3 hours, 21 minutes
 November 16, 1977  Enterprise, ferry flight test started and ended at the Armstrong Flight Research Center, lasted 4 hours, 17 minutes
 November 17, 1977  Enterprise, ferry flight test started and ended at the Armstrong Flight Research Center, lasted 4 hours, 13 minutes
 November 18, 1977  Enterprise, ferry flight test started and ended at the Armstrong Flight Research Center, lasted 3 hours, 37 minutes
 December 9, 1977  Enterprise, approach and landing flight tests Armstrong Flight Research Center, lasted 3 hours, 37 minutes
 March 10–13, 1978 Enterprise,  ferry flight from Armstrong Flight Research Center to Marshall Space Flight Center (via Ellington Air Force Base) for vertical ground vibration tests at MSFC.
 April 10, 1979 Enterprise,  ferry flight from Marshall Space Flight Center to Kennedy Space Center following vertical ground vibration tests at MSFC.
 August 10–16, 1979 Enterprise transported from Kennedy Space Center in Florida to Armstrong Flight Research Center in California (via Atlanta, St. Louis, Tulsa, Denver, Hill Air Force Base Utah, Vandenberg Air Force Base) following static tests at KSC

 May 16-June 12, 1983 Enterprise, tour of the United States, Canada and Europe. From Edwards Air Force Base to Peterson Air Force Base, McConnell Air Force Base, Wright-Patterson Air Force Base, CFB Goose Bay, Keflavik Naval Air Station, RAF Fairford (20 May), Cologne Bonn Airport, Paris Air Show (arrived 24 May), Ciampino Airport, Stansted Airport, Ottawa International Airport, Scott Air Force Base and Sheppard Air Force Base.
 March 22–29, 1984 Enterprise,  ferry flight from Edwards Air Force Base to Brookley Air Force Base (via Vandenberg Air Force Base) for overland and barge transport to the 1984 Louisiana World Exposition.
 November 10–13, 1984 Enterprise,  ferry flight from Brookley Air Force Base to Edwards Air Force Base (via Kansas City) following the 1984 Louisiana World Exposition.
 November 10–13, 1984 Enterprise,  ferry flight from Edwards Air Force Base to Vandenberg Air Force Base

Other transportation methods

Overland
Space shuttle orbiters were constructed in Palmdale, California and transported overland to the Armstrong Flight Research Center (AFRC), a distance of 36 miles.  The shuttle carrier aircraft was not used for this initial leg of the journey but was used to transport the orbiters to the Kennedy Space Center in Florida.  Additionally the orbiters were routinely towed from the Shuttle Landing Facility to the Orbiter Processing Facility after landing at the Kennedy Space Center either after missions or after removal from the SCA. 
 Enterprise  January 31, 1977 (Palmdale to DFRC) for ferry flight to KSC
 Columbia March 8, 1979 (Palmdale to DFRC) for ferry flight to KSC
 Enterprise  October 30, 1979 (DFRC to Palmdale) for ferry flight to KSC
 Challenger  July 1, 1982 (Palmdale to DFRC) for ferry flight to KSC
 Discovery  November 5, 1983 (Palmdale to DFRC)  for ferry flight to KSC
 Columbia January 30, 1984 (DFRC to Palmdale) for STS-17 modifications
 Enterprise  April 2, 1984 (Brookley Air Force Base, Mobile Alabama to U.S. Coast Guard Station, Mobile Alabama), for transfer to a barge for transport to New Orleans for the 1984 Louisiana World Exposition
 Atlantis  April 9, 1985 (Palmdale to DFRC) for ferry flight to KSC
 Columbia July 11, 1985 (Palmdale to DFRC) for ferry flight to KSC, following modifications
 Endeavour October 12–14, 2012 (LAX to California Science Center), for display

Barge

 Enterprise  April 3–5, 1984 (U.S. Coast Guard Station, Mobile Alabama to New Orleans),  for the 1984 Louisiana World Exposition
 Enterprise  November 3–5, 1984 (New Orleans to U.S. Coast Guard Station, Mobile Alabama), following the 1984 Louisiana World Exposition

References

NASA
Space Shuttle program